Madiya Beth Harriott (born 16 February 1999) is a US-born Jamaican footballer who plays as a defender for college team Vanderbilt Commodores and the Jamaica women's national team.

Early life
Harriott was born to a Jamaican father. She was raised in Davie, Florida.

College career
Harriott attends Vanderbilt University in Nashville, Tennessee.

International career
Harriott has represented Jamaica on the senior national team as well as the under-20 national team. She competed at the 2018 CONCACAF Women's U-20 Championship. She made her senior debut on 28 July 2019 against Mexico in the Pan American Games.

References

External links

1999 births
Living people
Citizens of Jamaica through descent
Jamaican women's footballers
Women's association football defenders
Jamaica women's international footballers
Pan American Games competitors for Jamaica
Footballers at the 2019 Pan American Games
Jamaican people of American descent
People from Davie, Florida
Sportspeople from Broward County, Florida
Soccer players from Florida
American women's soccer players
Vanderbilt Commodores women's soccer players
African-American women's soccer players
American sportspeople of Jamaican descent